Anthony Joshua vs Oleksandr Usyk, billed as The Perfect Storm, was a professional boxing match that was contested between WBA (Super), IBF, WBO, and IBO heavyweight champion, Anthony Joshua, and former undisputed cruiserweight champion and the WBO's heavyweight mandatory challenger, Oleksandr Usyk. The bout took place on 25 September 2021 at the Tottenham Hotspur Stadium, with Usyk winning by unanimous decision.

Background

Usyk became the first ever four-belt undisputed cruiserweight champion in 2018 after winning the World Boxing Super Series tournament. Following the decision to move up to the heavyweight division in 2019, and after Joshua lost his titles against Andy Ruiz Jr in June of that year, Usyk successfully petitioned the WBO to be installed as their mandatory challenger. Per the WBO's rules, a 'super champion' is entitled to the mandatory challenger status in the event they move to a different weight class. Joshua regained his titles by defeating Ruiz in a rematch in December 2019, prompting the WBO to order a fight between Joshua and Usyk. The following day, the IBF also ordered Joshua to face their mandatory challenger, Kubrat Pulev. After Joshua fulfilled his IBF mandatory with a victory over Pulev in December 2020, the WBO held off on ordering a fight between Joshua and Usyk while talks progressed between the former and Tyson Fury for an undisputed heavyweight title bout.

In the meantime, Usyk's team entered into negotiations with Joe Joyce, with the intention of fighting for the WBO interim title. However, on 17 May, a day after Fury confirmed the date of a Joshua fight, the news broke that a judge had ordered Fury to fulfill a prior contractual obligation and face Deontay Wilder before September 2021. The following day the WBO issued Joshua's promoter, Eddie Hearn, with a "show cause" order, giving him 48 hours to provide proof of a contract between Joshua and Fury, and failure to do so would force Joshua to enter negotiations with Usyk. Hearn requested an extension on the deadline, which was denied by the WBO, who then ordered Joshua to reach a deal with Usyk within 10 days before holding a purse bid for rights to the fight.

On 25 June, Hearn announced that the bout would take place on 25 September, at the Tottenham Hotspur Stadium.

Fight results 
Oleksandr Usyk became only the third boxer in history – after Evander Holyfield and David Haye – to win world titles both at cruiserweight and heavyweight. At the same time, Anthony Joshua's defeat left the prospect of a highly anticipated undisputed unification bout with Tyson Fury in tatters.

According to CompuBox, Oleksandr Usyk connected more total punches than Anthony Joshua – 148 to 123. He was also more precise of the two opponents, landing 28% of punches thrown compared to Joshua's 19.2%. Usyk's landed punches were the most by a Joshua opponent. Usyk closed the show by landing 29 punches in round 12, the most by a Joshua opponent.

After the fight, Usyk performed a Cossack dance in the ring to celebrate his victory.

Scoring card by judges 
1.  Howard Foster (red): 113–115 for Usyk
2.  Steve Weisfield (white): 112–116 for Usyk
3.  Viktor Fesechko (blue): 112–117 for Usyk

Reception 
Critics universally praised Usyk's performance during the fight. Coral Barry of BBC Sport called it "exceptional", "incredible" and a "masterclass". Chris Eubank Jr. called it "one of the biggest statements in boxing for a very long time". Lennox Lewis called it "a great tactical performance". Max Kellerman compared the match to Holmes vs. Spinks, in which a reign of a bigger boxer was likewise ended. Roy Jones Jr. reacted: "Usyk didn't beat [Joshua]. He dominated him".

Regarding the defender's performance, Coral Barry noted: "It was a strange, almost hapless display from Joshua which leaves his legacy as one of the heavyweight greats in ruins."

Aftermath 

Immediately after the fight, Anthony Joshua's team has "activated in principle" the rematch clause to face Oleksandr Usyk in early 2022. Eddie Hearn has warned that Joshua will be more aggressive in the rematch: "You'll see a different Anthony Joshua in this fight… This game plan is not box and move, this plan is to go in and hurt Usyk". On 10 October, Joshua officially exercised his contractual right to an immediate rematch. On 22 June, it was announced that a rematch was scheduled to take place in Jeddah, Saudi Arabia on 20 August with Usyk defending the WBA, WBO and IBF championship belts, and Joshua, as the challenger.

Fight card

Broadcasting
The undercard was televised for a 30 minute Freeview on Sky Sports Arena, Sky Sports Mix and Sky Sports Boxing YouTube. The main event was televised live on Sky Sports Box Office PPV in the United Kingdom and Ireland, as well as MEGOGO in Ukraine.

References

Boxing matches
Boxing matches involving Anthony Joshua
Boxing matches involving Oleksandr Usyk
DAZN
2021 in boxing
2021 in British sport
September 2021 sports events in the United Kingdom
2021 sports events in London
International Boxing Federation heavyweight championship matches
International Boxing Organization heavyweight championship matches
World Boxing Association heavyweight championship matches
World Boxing Organization heavyweight championship matches